Laura Bryan Birn (born April 3, 1965, in Chicago, Illinois) is an American actress known for her role as Paul Williams' assistant, Lynne Bassett, on the soap opera, The Young and the Restless. On contract from 1988 to 2005, it was then stated she'd been dropped to recurring, though she never appeared again.

She is the daughter of television writer Jerry Birn.

External links 
 

1965 births
Living people
Actresses from Chicago
American soap opera actresses
21st-century American women